Bundesbahn may refer to:
 Deutsche Bundesbahn
 Österreichische Bundesbahn
Schweizerische Bundesbahnen